The Rhode Island Department of Children, Youth & Families (DCYF) is a state agency of Rhode Island, headquartered in Downtown Providence. The agency provides services for children and families.

Juvenile corrections
The agency is responsible for the state's juvenile corrections. The Rhode Island Training School (RITS) is a secure residential facility for juvenile delinquents. RITS is located in Cranston.

A previous facility, with separate facilities for adjudicated boys and girls, was constructed in the 1960s. By the 2000s, there were so few girls adjudicated in Rhode Island that they lived together in one unit and shared day schedules with boys. In the 2000s, the state ordered the construction of a new RITS building. In 2009 Governor of Rhode Island Donald Carcieri proposed that Rhode Island Housing, a state agency that is set up like a corporation, buy the former RITS site in Cranston.

June 2013 foster care death and abuse 

In June 2013, a child's arm was broken at DCYF facility Harmony Hill School and a toddler in foster care was found dead.  Following these incidents, The Providence Phoenix asserted that those in power in Rhode Island so that foster care abuse and deaths can be prevented.

References

External links

 Rhode Island Department of Children, Youth & Families
 "List of New and Amended Rules Relating to the RI Training School."
 "Rhode Island Training School Manual." - Rhode Island Department of Children, Youth & Families
 "The Boys Training School at Sockanosset." - City of Cranston

Child abuse in the United States
Child welfare in the United States
State agencies of Rhode Island
Juvenile detention centers in the United States
State corrections departments of the United States